Thomas Jerome Newton can refer to:

A character in the novel The Man Who Fell to Earth
Thomas Jerome Newton was played by David Bowie in the 1976 film adaptation
The character was renamed John Dory and played by Lewis Smith in the 1987 TV film adaptation
Bowie's version of the character was played by Michael C. Hall in the musical sequel Lazarus
A character in the show Fringe, played by Sebastian Roché